Guillermo Mediano (born 3 February 1976) is a Spanish former backstroke swimmer who competed in the 2000 Summer Olympics.

References

1976 births
Living people
Spanish male backstroke swimmers
Olympic swimmers of Spain
Swimmers at the 2000 Summer Olympics